Gennady Riger (‎; 24 May 1948 – 12 October 2015) was an Israeli politician who served as a member of the Knesset for Yisrael BaAliyah between 1999 and 2003.

Biography
Born in the Soviet Union, Riger studied mechanical engineering at Lviv University, obtaining a second degree. He worked as an engineer before making aliyah to Israel in 1990.

In 1992 he was involved in founding the immigrant's party Da. In 1996 he became general secretary of another immigrant's party, Yisrael BaAliyah. He was placed fifth on the Yisrael BaAliyah list for the 1999 elections, and entered the Knesset as the party won six seats.

He was placed fourth on the list for the 2003 elections, but lost his seat as the party was reduced to just 2 MKs. He later founded a political consulting firm, Politeck.

A father of one, Riger was married and lived in Kfar Saba.

References

External links

1948 births
2015 deaths
Israeli mechanical engineers
Israeli people of Ukrainian-Jewish descent
Jewish Israeli politicians
Members of the 15th Knesset (1999–2003)
People from Kfar Saba
Soviet emigrants to Israel
Soviet Jews
20th-century Ukrainian engineers
Ukrainian Jews
University of Lviv alumni
Yisrael BaAliyah politicians